The Borough of Eastleigh is a local government district and borough in Hampshire, England, bordering the unitary authority of Southampton, Test Valley, the City of Winchester and the Borough of Fareham. Eastleigh is separated from the New Forest by Southampton Water.  Water bounds much of the borough, with Southampton Water and the River Hamble bordering the east and southwest of the district.  The built-up nature of neighbouring Southampton and the urban area around the town of Eastleigh contrast with the rural nature of much of the borough, which lies within the Hampshire Basin.

The original Eastleigh borough was formed in 1936 following the incorporation of the former Eastleigh Urban District Council. The borough as it is today was formed in 1974, when the existing Borough of Eastleigh expanded to include part of the former Winchester Rural District as a result of the Local Government Act 1972. The name of the borough was chosen by the children's author, Charlotte Mary Yonge. There are eight parishes within the borough, but some areas are unparished and controlled directly by the borough council, which has 44 seats. The council's headquarters is in the town of Eastleigh itself. The borough is also served by seven county councillors and two members of Parliament. The borough's Latin motto, "Salus populi suprema lex" translates as "The Welfare of the People is the most important Law".

Eastleigh is rather urbanised with a population of 125,900 in the 2011 census and a high population density. However, that population is in better general health than the South East region and the country. The borough is served by two motorways and seven railway stations as well as an international airport. There is also a ferry linking Hamble-le-Rice in Eastleigh to Warsash in Fareham, and a disused canal running through the north of the borough.

There are eight scheduled monuments and around 180 listed buildings in the borough, with Netley Abbey, Bursledon Windmill, the chapel of Netley Hospital, and Netley Castle among them. The borough also contains eight conservation areas and around 20,000 trees protected by tree preservation orders.

History

The borough's origins begin with the formation of a parish covering the villages of Eastley and Barton in 1868. Author Charlotte Mary Yonge, a resident of Otterbourne, donated £500 (£ in ) towards the cost of building a parish church and in return was asked which of the two villages to name the parish after; she chose Eastley, but also chose to alter the spelling to Eastleigh as she considered this more modern. The parish grew rapidly: it had a population of 515 in 1871, over 1,000 in 1881 and 3,613 in 1891.

In order to facilitate the creation of pavements with kerbs, drains and sewers, and street lights, a local board was established in 1893. Two years later, the local board was replaced by Eastleigh Urban District Council, which was merged with the neighbouring community of Bishopstoke in 1899, retaining the Eastleigh name.

The first Eastleigh Borough was incorporated in 1936 under the Municipal Corporations Act 1882. This conversion from Eastleigh Urban District Council to Eastleigh Borough Council allowed the authority to create bylaws. Notice of the petition for incorporation was served on the 1 February 1936, and the matter being raised for consideration on 16 March, along with petitions for the creation of boroughs for Crosby and Sale in North West England, among others.

The Local Government Act 1972 resulted in this borough of Eastleigh merging with seven parishes from the Winchester Rural District to become the borough as it is today, with effect from 1 April 1974.

In 2006, the borough was ranked the ninth best place to live in the UK by a Channel 4 programme.

Governance

Most of the borough has a three-tier local government system, consisting of a local parish council or town council (there are nine parishes and one town in the borough), Eastleigh Borough Council itself, and Hampshire County Council. However, some areas, including the town of Eastleigh itself, do not have a parish council and are governed directly by the borough council. There are 39 seats on the borough council across 14 wards. At present, 34 of these 39 seats are held by Liberal Democrat councillors, with three Independent councillours, two Conservatives, and no Labour councillors. The council has a strong tradition of attending to environmental matters and in 2008 was named a beacon council under the theme "Tackling Climate Change". The council is rated as "good" by the Audit Commission.

Eastleigh is represented on Hampshire County Council by eight councillors (currently seven Liberal Democrats and one Conservative), and in Parliament by two MPs.  Most of the borough is covered by the Eastleigh constituency, represented by Paul Holmes of the Conservative Party. The remaining wards, which cover Chandler's Ford and Hiltingbury, belong to the Winchester constituency, represented by Steve Brine of the Conservative Party.

The various wards and parishes are grouped into five subdivisions of Eastleigh, each with a local area committee of borough councillors. These five subdivisions are as follows:

Council composition
Following the 2019 Borough Council elections, the composition is as follows:

Keith House is the leader of the Council.

Geography

The southern part of the borough is bounded on the east by the River Hamble (separating it from Fareham) and on the west by Southampton Water (separating it from the New Forest). The Hamble flows into Southampton Water at Hamble-le-Rice, thus accounting for the borough's southern boundary. Further north, the borough borders Southampton to the west and the City of Winchester district to the north. As well as Southampton Water and the River Hamble, a number of watercourses flow through Eastleigh, including the River Itchen, Monks Brook and the Itchen Navigation.

The largest settlement in the borough is the town of Eastleigh itself, with a continuous urban area which now includes Chandler's Ford, Bishopstoke and Boyatt Wood. The only other settlement in the borough with town status is Hedge End. Due to the urban nature of Southampton and the town of Eastleigh, the western side of the borough is generally more built up than the east. There are three country parks in the borough, Itchen Valley in West End and Lakeside, located just to the south of the town of Eastleigh, are managed by the borough council while Royal Victoria Country Park is managed by Hampshire County Council.

The borough is within the Hampshire Basin, with an underlying geology of mainly Cretaceous chalk.

Soil in the borough is principally of poor to moderate agricultural quality although high grade land is present in pockets. The south of the borough has acid soils and gravels, but poorly drained clays predominate in the north. Most of the borough is covered by a series of clays and marls, with sandy and lignitic beds, part of the Bracklesham Group of beds. As well as clay soils, the Bracklesham Beds result in some bands of sandy soil to the north of West End, and podzol soils around the M27 motorway west of Hedge End and on small areas of the gravels on top of the beds themselves. However most of the soil over the beds is more fertile brown earth.

In the north of the borough, small pockets of valley gravels, London clay, Brickearth and Alluvium can be found, although these have mainly been built over with the exception of the Alluvium, which forms peaty soils around the floodplain of the River Itchen.

Climate
As with the rest of the UK, Eastleigh experiences an oceanic climate (Köppen Cfb). The nearest weather station to the Borough is in Southampton, which has held the record for the highest temperature in the UK for June at  since 1976.

Demography
In the 2001 census, Eastleigh had a population of 120,749, consisting of 57,000 males and 59,169 females. The borough is much more densely populated than South East England or even England as a whole, with a population density of 14.56 people per hectare (South East England and England have 4.20 and 3.77 respectively). Over 76 per cent of Eastleigh's population state their religion as Christian, which is slightly higher than the South East region and the rest of the country. 15.23 per cent stated they had no religion and 6.43 per cent did not state a religion; the most popular non-Christian religions in the borough were Sikhism (0.5%), Hinduism (0.34%) and Islam (0.31%). The census also indicates that the residents of Eastleigh are generally in better health than those in the wider region and country.

Economy

Historically, the economy of the area has strong links with the transport industry. The proximity of substantial waterways made shipbuilding a major industry in the south of the borough, and today the pleasure boat industry still dominates the area around Hamble-le-Rice and Bursledon, made famous by the television drama series on the subject, Howards' Way, which was filmed in the area. The borough is also strongly linked with the Spitfire, the first test flights of which took place from Southampton Airport in Eastleigh.

The economy of the borough today is dominated by the retail sector, which accounts for around 33 per cent of the jobs in the borough, and this proportion is rising. As well as the large Swan Centre, a shopping centre in the town of Eastleigh, there is a large out-of-town retail development near Hedge End which includes flagship stores for Marks & Spencer and Sainsbury's among others. Eastleigh also has proportionately more manufacturing and construction jobs than the nation, but the number of jobs in these sectors is declining in the borough.

The B&Q head office is in the Portswood House in Eastleigh, Eastleigh borough.

Landmarks

There are eight scheduled ancient monuments in Eastleigh, around 180 listed buildings (9 of which are Grade II* listed, the remainder are Grade II) and over 800 tree preservation orders covering 20,000 trees across 5,000 properties. The council also maintains a "local list" of buildings which are of local importance but do not meet English Heritage's listing criteria.

The area around Netley is particularly rich in notable historic landmarks, with Netley Abbey, Netley Castle and Netley Hospital all nearby.  The borough also boasts Hampshire's only functioning windmill, Bursledon Windmill, and eight conservation areas.

Transport

The M3 motorway runs through the north-west of the borough, providing a direct road route to London, and the midlands and north of England via the A34 road which joins the M3 just north of Winchester. The M27 motorway also runs through much of the borough, linking Eastleigh to the rest of the south coast.

There are seven railway stations in the borough, served by the South West Main Line, the Eastleigh to Romsey Line, the Eastleigh to Fareham Line, the West Coastway Line and the Cross Country Route.  Passenger train operators serving the Eastleigh stations are South Western Railway, CrossCountry and Southern.

Southampton Airport is located in the north west of the borough, just south of the town of Eastleigh itself. The airport is the 20th largest in the United Kingdom and flights operate from there to destinations throughout the British Isles (including the Channel Islands) and some destinations in western continental Europe.

Local bus services in Eastleigh are primarily operated by Blue Star, with other operators including First Hampshire & Dorset and Stagecoach Group. National coach operators such as National Express tend not to serve Eastleigh due to the close proximity of Southampton and Winchester to the borough.

The disused Itchen Navigation runs through the north of the borough, and in the south, Hamble is served by the Hamble-Warsash Ferry.

Education

The local education authority for Eastleigh is Hampshire County Council, which lists 40 schools in the borough. In addition, there are two further education colleges in the town of Eastleigh, and a number of private schools such as the Gregg School in Chartwell Green and King's School in Fair Oak.

International relationships
The Borough of Eastleigh is twinned with:
 Villeneuve-Saint-Georges, France
 Kornwestheim, Germany
has a friendship alliance with:
 Kimry, Russia
and has one Sister City:
 Temple Terrace, Florida, United States

Eastleigh was awarded the European Flag of Honour in 1983 to mark the twentieth anniversary of the Borough's twinning with Villeneuve-Saint-Georges. The flag, which is awarded to local authorities which promote pan-Europe relationships, was presented to the council by a European Commission representative on 18 June 1983.

Freedom of the Borough
The following people and military units have received the Freedom of the Borough of Eastleigh.

Individuals
 Sir David Price : 1977.
  Godfrey G. Olson : 1977.
 Norman F.N. Norris: 1977.
 Peter A.T. Green: 1977.
 Frank Edward Brown: 1986.
 Dennis A. Tranah: 1986.
 Suzanne Bartlet: 1989.
 George E. Raymond : 1995.
 Margaret Kyrle : 2003. 
 Rt Hon Lord Chidgey: 2005.
 Christopher Tapp: 2006.
 Doreen Wellfare: 2008.
 Philip Spearey: 21 January 2011.
 David Smith : 2013.
 Dani King : 2013.
 Nirmal Purja : 14 March 2022.

Military Units
 The Royal Hampshire Regiment: September 1991.
 The Princess of Wales's Royal Regiment: 9 September 1992.

See also
List of places of worship in the Borough of Eastleigh

References

 
Non-metropolitan districts of Hampshire
Boroughs in England